Seder Olam (Hebrew: סדר עולם) is the name of two works of early rabbinical literature dealing largely with religious chronology. The two works are:
 Seder Olam Rabbah, the earlier and larger work
 Seder Olam Zutta, the smaller work

Rabbinic literature